The cargo ship Akra Aktion (prior name Steven) was built in 1957 in Amsterdam, the Netherlands with following features : 
Length 91,40 m, 
Wide 12,54 m, 
Draught 6,75 m, 
Capacity 3851 tdw, 
Engine 1600 CP 

The cargo ship had sailed under a Greek flag and started its journey from Brăila with 3575,52 tons steel laminate to Alexandria, Egypt. On 19.02.1981 the ship got into a storm and was stranded several hundred meters from Vama Veche beach. The water was only a few meters deep.

The crew was saved, but the ship was not salvageable. The cargo was recovered 20 years later. Now due the decay from rust and waves, only a small part of the wreck, the bow is sometimes visible over the water.

See also
MV E Evangelia

References

External links

Shipwrecks in the Black Sea
Shipwrecks of Romania
Maritime incidents in 1981
1957 ships